The Society of the Sacred Heart of Jesus, abbreviated RSCJ is a Catholic centralized religious institute of consecrated life of Pontifical Right for women established in France by St. Madeleine Sophie Barat in 1800.

History

Madeleine Sophie Barat founded the Society of the Sacred Heart of Jesus in the wake of the French Revolution to provide educational opportunities for girls. The manner of life was to be simple without the prescribed austerities of the older orders, which would be incompatible with the work of education. In some houses the religious conducted just one school, but in several places, especially in the larger houses in cities there were at least two schools, a boarding school and a school for poor children. The first convent was opened at Amiens in 1801. Other houses were opened in Grenoble, Niort, Poitiers and Cuigniers. In 1826 the society obtained the formal approbation of Pope Leo XII and the first cardinal protector was appointed. Barat remained superior general of the Society from 1806 until her death in 1865. The Society of the Sacred Heart quickly expanded within Europe and beyond.

In 1818 Rose Philippine Duchesne first brought the Society to the Americas, establishing the first free school west of the Mississippi in St. Charles Missouri. The Society opened institutions of higher education for women in Cincinnati; Grand Coteau, Louisiana; Lake Forest, Illinois; New York; Torresdale (a suburb of Philadelphia), Pennsylvania; San Diego; Omaha; St. Louis; San Francisco; Seattle and Newton, Massachusetts.

The Society came to England in 1842, founding a girl's boarding school at Elm Grove in Roehampton. That school evolved into a teacher training school Digby Stuart College. The Sisters have been involved in education ever since, and founded schools around the country. Most are no longer directly run by the order but are under its trusteeship or the diocese. In 2004 Digby Stuart College federated with three other local colleges to become the University of Roehampton. The England and Wales province is largely centered in Roehampton where it maintains two houses. The Barat House community consists of a group of RSCJ sisters and university students who live in the community house in the grounds of Digby Stuart College. The Duchesne House is also a registered care house for elderly sisters. Its community plays an active role in the pastoral care of pupils at the nearby Sacred Heart Primary School.

The first RSCJ arrived in New Zealand in 1880. In 1909 RSCJ established a Catholic girls school, Baradene College of the Sacred Heart in Remuera, Auckland, New Zealand. Sr. Philomene (Phil) Tiernan, RSCJ of the Australis/New Zealand Province was among the passengers of Malaysia Airlines flight MH17 shot down over the Ukraine in 2014.

Between 1906 and 1909, the French government forced the closing of forty-seven houses of the Society in that country, and 2500 religious were dispersed to other countries. The motherhouse was relocated to Ixelles, Belgium. The rule of cloister was removed at the General Chapter of 1964.

The first foundation in Uganda was established by six RSCJ in 1962. In 1984 RSCJ took over management of the St. Charles Lwanga Girls' Training Centre, in Kalungu, founded in 1967 by Fr. Emiliano La Croix of the Missionaries of Africa.

Reparations for slavery in the United States
"Along with bishops, priests, the Jesuits and most of the families of their students, the communities of the Religious of the Sacred Heart, from the time of Philippine until the Civil War, owned, bought and sold enslaved persons in the slave states of Missouri and Louisiana. Enslaved persons built the buildings, made the bricks and sustained the foundations. They worked side by side with the sisters, taking care of the children, cooking, washing and gardening. ... It is known that the Society of the Sacred Heart of Jesus had enslaved persons in Grand Coteau, Louisiana; Convent,Louisiana; Natchitoches, Louisiana; and St. Louis and Florissant, Missouri."... In September 2018, the Academy of the Sacred Heart in Grand Coteau dedicated "a monument in the parish cemetery naming the enslaved persons of the convent known to be buried there. The museum at the school will have an area dedicated to the convent’s history and acknowledgment of its role in slavery. The names of all known enslaved persons will be part of this area of the museum. A plaque will be placed at the slave quarters naming those living there in its first years." "The Society of the Sacred Heart announced the creation of the Cor Unum Scholarship to provide tuition assistance to African American students desiring a Sacred Heart education at Schools of the Sacred Heart – Grand Coteau in Grand Coteau, Louisiana, and to provide professional development for faculty and staff and/or course curriculum to students on inclusion and diversity."

Ministry
As of 2015 about 2,600 religious serve in 41 countries around the world. Members do many works, but focus on education, particularly girls' education. There are about 75 RSCJ in the Province of England and Wales. Since 1979, members of the Llannerchwen Community have operated a retreat centre near Brecon, Wales.

In Uganda and Kenya, sisters are involved in teaching from Primary level to University level, in counseling, pastoral work, development of village women, work in prisons, health care, AIDS education, home-based care of those with AIDS and a home for children with disabilities.

Association Mondiale des Anciennes et Anciens du Sacré-Coeur (AMASC) is a worldwide organization of alumnae and alumni of Sacred Heart schools established in 1960 to cooperate effectively with the Society of the Sacred Heart in its mission and ministries. One of its projects is providing support for the Sacred Heart School at Kyamusansala Hill, Uganda. Support included the construction of a residential school which as of 2015 provides education for 530 girls.

The society holds NGO status at the UN as a special consultant with the Economic and Social Council.

Notable members
Madeleine Sophie Barat
Karuna Mary Braganza
Mary T. Clark
Grace Dammann
Rose Philippine Duchesne
Yelizaveta Golitsyna 
Mary Aloysia Hardey
Anne Montgomery
Eleanor O'Byrne
Harriet Padberg
Janet Erskine Stuart, fifth Superior General of the Society of the Sacred Heart, author of The Education of Catholic Girls

See also
Schools of the Sacred Heart

References

External links
RSCJ International - International official website.
  Mother Janet Erskine Stuart, RSCJ
United States - Canada Province
 Network of Sacred Heart Schools in the United States and Canada
World Association of Alumnae and Alumni of the Sacred Heart (schools)

 
Catholic female orders and societies
Religious organizations established in 1800
Catholic religious institutes established in the 18th century
1800 establishments in France
Reparations for slavery